Maine Sting is an American soccer team based in Bangor, Maine, United States. Founded in 2008, the team plays in National Premier Soccer League (NPSL), a national amateur league at the fourth tier of the American Soccer Pyramid, in the Eastern Atlantic Division.

The team plays its home games at the John Boucher Soccer Field on the campus of Husson College, where they have played since 2008. The team's colors are sky blue, white, and gold.

History

Players

Current roster
as at June 7, 2009

Year-by-year

Head coaches
  Bill Ashby (2008)
  Jukka Masalin (2009–present)

Stadia
 John Boucher Soccer Field at Husson College; Bangor, Maine (2008–present)

External links
Maine Sting
CTEcreative Logo Design

National Premier Soccer League teams
Soccer clubs in Maine
Sports in Bangor, Maine
2008 establishments in Maine
Association football clubs established in 2008